Anton Bruckner is best known for his symphonic works; there are 11 symphonies (the last with an unfinished finale), most of them in several versions. He also composed a few other smaller orchestral works (one overture, one march and three 'small orchestral pieces'), and sketched another symphony.

Bruckner also composed a considerable amount of choral music. There are 59 religious works, of which there are 17 larger choral works (seven masses, two requiems, one religious cantata, five psalm settings, one Te Deum hymn and one Magnificat hymn), 40 smaller choral works (16 hymns, six antiphons, six graduals, three settings of the offertorium, two chorale, two religious elegies, two Libera me, one litany and two other motets), of which a few are in two or three versions, and two aequali for three trombones. In addition, Bruckner made sketches for two other masses and another requiem. Bruckner also composed 44 Weltliche Chorwerke (secular choral works), seven secular cantatas, of which two are in three versions, and about 20 Lieder for voice and piano.

Bruckner's chamber music includes one theme and variations and six scherzos for string quartet, one string quartet with alternative rondo, one string quintet with additional intermezzo, one duo for violin and piano, and about 50 small piano works.

Other instrumental music includes a few organ works, of which some are of doubtful authorship, and one military march for concert band.

Werkverzeichnis Anton Bruckner (WAB) 
This is a thematic catalogue of the music of Anton Bruckner compiled by Renate Grasberger. Lost works, sketches, etc. were added afterwards. The WAB uses a single range of numbers divided into subranges for genre classification. Grasberger sorted the compositions alphabetically by title within each of the subranges. For a few of the pieces, she used an alternate title, which is less used today, or classified them in different subranges than the current Gesamtausgabe.

New attributions and findings, as well as the re-evaluation of the incerta and falsa, require a in-depth revision of the WAB classification. This work is done in the framework of the research project Digitales Werkverzeichnis Anton Bruckner (dWAB, 2017–2019) of the Österreichische Akademie der Wissenschaften.
WAB deest works are classified as follows

List

References

Sources 
 Renate Grasberger, Werkverzeichnis Anton Bruckner (WAB), Publikationen des Instituts für österreichische Musikdokumentation, Hans Schneider, Tutzing, 1977 – 
 Uwe Harten, Anton Bruckner. Ein Handbuch. , Salzburg, 1996. .
 Anton Bruckner – Sämtliche Werke, Band XXIII/1: Lieder für Gesang und Klavier (1851–1882), Musikwissenschaftlicher Verlag der Internationalen Bruckner-Gesellschaft, Angela Pachovsky (Editor), Vienna, 1997
 Anton Bruckner – Sämtliche Werke, Band XXIII/2: Weltliche Chorwerke (1843–1893), Musikwissenschaftlicher Verlag der Internationalen Bruckner-Gesellschaft, Angela Pachovsky (Editor), Vienna, 2001 
 Anton Bruckner – Sämtliche Werke, Band XXV: Kitzler-Studienbuch (1861–1863), facsimile, Musikwissenschaftlicher Verlag der Internationalen Bruckner-Gesellschaft, Paul Hawkshaw and Erich Wolfgang Partsch (Editors), Vienna, 2015
 Derek Watson, Bruckner, Master Musicians Series, J. M. Dent & Sons Ltd, London, 1996. 
 Cornelis van Zwol, Anton Bruckner 1824–1896 – Leven en werken, uitg. Thoth, Bussum, Netherlands, 2012.

External links 
 Discography of Bruckners orchestral works by John Berky 
 Critical discography of Bruckners other instrumental and vocal works by Hans Roelofs 
 Anton Bruckner Gesamtausgabe
 Overview of Bruckner's Gesamtausgabe (Critical Complete Edition) published by the Austrian National Library and the International Bruckner Society
 Bruckner online – Werkverzeichnis Anton Bruckner (WAB) und musikalischer Nachlass

Bruckner, Anton
Bruckner